Chicagoland is the Chicago metropolitan area.

Chicagoland may also refer to:
ChicagoLand Speedway, a motorsports venue in Joliet, Illinois
Chicagoland Sports Hall of Fame in Des Plaines, Illinois
Chicagoland Chamber of Commerce
Chicagoland (TV series), a 2014 CNN television series
Chicagoland Vampires, a series of urban fantasy vampire novels

See also
Chicago (disambiguation)